Lennox-King Glacier is a large valley glacier, about  long, draining Bowden Névé and flowing northeast between the Holland Range and the Queen Alexandra Range of Antarctica to enter Richards Inlet, Ross Ice Shelf. It was named by the New Zealand Geological Survey Antarctic Expedition (1959–60) for Lieutenant Commander James Lennox-King, Royal New Zealand Navy, leader at Scott Base, 1960.

See also
Vertigo Bluff

References

Glaciers of the Ross Dependency
Shackleton Coast